Anavitória is the debut studio album by Brazilian duo Anavitória. It was released on August 19, 2016 The album was produced by Tiago Iorc.

Anavitória was nominated for Best Portuguese Language Contemporary Pop Album at the 18th Latin Grammy Awards and the song "Trevo (Tu)" won the Best Portuguese Language Song award in the same edition.

Track listing

Charts

References

2016 debut albums
Portuguese-language albums
Anavitória albums